Déjame vivir (English title: Let me live) is a Mexican telenovela produced by Valentín Pimstein for Televisa in 1982. This is a remake of the 1970 Venezuelan telenovela Cristina. The reception for this telenovela was not good, in fact it was selected as the worst one of 1982.

Daniela Romo and Gregorio Casal starred as protagonists, while the first actress Beatriz Aguirre and Elizabeth Dupeyrón starred as antagonists.

Plot
Estrella struggles to move forward with her family (a younger brother very attached to her, a teenage and ambitious sister and an almost absent father). She is the dressmaker of Graciela who hires the girl to make her clothes, so Estrella have to go every now and then her house to take measures, in one of these visits she meets her son Enrique who is immediately attracted. Enrique begins a relationship with Estrella and Graciela meddles since her son can not fall in love with a seamstress.

Cast
Daniela Romo as Estrella
Gregorio Casal as Enrique
Elizabeth Dupeyrón as Gilda
Beatriz Aguirre as Graciela
Servando Manzetti as Gustavo
José Reymundi as German "El Duque"
Macaria as Yolanda
Rosalba Brambila as Nina
Ruben Rojo as Nicolas
Rodolfo Gomez Lora as Tomasito
Lilia Aragón as Dalia
Magda Karina as Mercedes
Maricruz Nájera as Josefina
José Elías Moreno as Rafael

References

External links
 

1982 telenovelas
Mexican telenovelas
1982 Mexican television series debuts
1982 Mexican television series endings
Television shows set in Mexico
Televisa telenovelas
Mexican television series based on Venezuelan television series
Spanish-language telenovelas